Lotte Eriksen (born 24 January 1987, in Stavanger) is a professional squash player who represents Norway. She reached a career-high world ranking of World No. 53 in December 2014.

References

External links 

Norwegian squash players
Living people
1987 births
Sportspeople from Stavanger